The Autovía de los Viñedos is a motorway in Spain. It passes through the region of Castile-La Mancha.

References

Autopistas and autovías in Spain